The 2018–19 Plunket Shield was the 90th season of the Plunket Shield, the domestic first-class cricket competition in New Zealand. It took place between October 2018 and March 2019. Unlike the previous edition of the competition, the tournament featured eight rounds of matches, instead of ten. Central Districts were the defending champions. Up to eleven international players, including New Zealand's captain Kane Williamson, were available for the opening round of the tournament.

In the opening round of fixtures, in the match between Central Districts and Canterbury, both teams declared one of their innings for no runs, in a rain-affected match, to ensure that a result was possible. The same situation also happened in round seven of the tournament, with Auckland declaring their first innings for no runs and Canterbury declaring their innings on 22/2 to get a result.

Ahead of the final round of fixtures, Central Districts had a fifteen point lead over Canterbury, needing just five more points to win the competition and retain their title. However, following the Christchurch mosque shootings, Canterbury withdrew from their final game, against Wellington, therefore Central Districts retained their title. It was the first time in more than fifty years that Central Districts had won back-to-back titles.

Points table

 Champions

Fixtures

Round 1

Round 2

Round 3

Round 4

Round 5

Round 6

Round 7

Round 8

References

External links
 Series home at ESPN Cricinfo

Plunket Shield
2018–19 New Zealand cricket season
Plunket Shield